These are the official results of the Men's 4x100 metres event at the 1990 European Championships in Split, Yugoslavia, held at Stadion Poljud on 31 August 1990.

Medalists

Results

Final
31 August

Heats
31 August

Heat 1

Heat 2

Participation
According to an unofficial count, 36 athletes from 9 countries participated in the event.

 (4)
 (4)
 (4)
 (4)
 (4)
 (4)
 (4)
 (4)
 (4)

See also
 1991 Men's World Championships 4 × 100 m Relay (Tokyo)
 1992 Men's Olympic 4 × 100 m Relay (Barcelona)
 1993 Men's World Championships 4 × 100 m Relay (Stuttgart)

References

 Results

Relay 4 x 100
Relays at the European Athletics Championships